"Matilda tank" may refer to:

 Matilda I (tank), also known by its specification number A11, a British infantry tank in service 1938–1940
 Matilda II,  A12, a British infantry tank in service 1939–1945